The Hoarder Next Door is a British documentary series about compulsive hoarding. Produced by Twenty Twenty and shown on Channel 4 it features psychotherapist Stelios Kiosses helping extreme hoarders. The show is narrated by Olivia Colman.

Episodes

Transmissions

Series 1
The first series began on 3 May 2012 on Channel 4.

Christmas Special

Series 2
The second series began on 15 April 2013 on Channel 4.

Series 3
The third and final series began on 13 March 2014 on Channel 4.

References

External links 

2012 British television series debuts
2014 British television series endings
British television documentaries
Compulsive hoarding
Channel 4 original programming
English-language television shows